Meringostylus is a genus of flies in the family Stratiomyidae.

Species
Meringostylus chiquitanus Lindner, 1930
Meringostylus schineri Kertész, 1908

References

Stratiomyidae
Brachycera genera
Taxa named by Kálmán Kertész
Diptera of South America